This list of Ports and harbours in Kenya details the ports, harbours around the coast of Kenya.

List of ports and harbours in Kenya

References

Ports

Kenya